Rosetta Salomon Swaab (1759–1825), was a Dutch circus performer and circus owner.  

She was married to the tightrope walker and equestrian Lion Kinsbergen (1750–1813) and performed by his side. She was a famous artist in the Netherlands of her time, performing as a tightrope walker and as an acrobat on horses. She and her spouse toured with their own circus company around the country with a base in Amsterdam. After the death of her spouse in 1813, she took over the circus as owner and manager.

References 

 

1759 births
1825 deaths
18th-century circus performers
19th-century circus performers
Tightrope walkers
18th-century dancers
Dutch equestrians
Circus owners
19th-century Dutch businesswomen
19th-century Dutch businesspeople